Catherine Herbert, Countess of Pembroke (née Yekaterina Semyonovna Vorontsova; ; 24 October 1784 – 27 March 1856), was a Russian noblewoman who married the Earl of Pembroke.

She was born in Saint Petersburg, the daughter of Count Semyon Vorontsov (sometimes spelt Woronzow), the Russian ambassador in Britain from 1785. She was the only sister of Prince Mikhail Vorontsov, Viceroy of New Russia and Caucasus (1782–1856). She was also a niece of Princess Dashkova, a friend of Catherine the Great and a conspirator in the coup d'état that deposed Tsar Peter III and put his wife on the throne.

In 1808, she married lieutenant general George Herbert, 11th Earl of Pembroke as his second wife and became Countess of Pembroke, the châtelaine of Wilton House, Wiltshire.

One source describes her as a linguist and musician. Her letters show her to have been a shrewd observer of European politics.

Children

References

1784 births
1856 deaths
Ladies-in-waiting from the Russian Empire
Emigrants from the Russian Empire to the United Kingdom
Catherine
English countesses
Wives of knights
Nobility from Saint Petersburg